The 2012–13 UC Riverside Highlanders men's basketball team represented University of California, Riverside during the 2012–13 NCAA Division I men's basketball season. The Highlanders, led by sixth year head coach Jim Wooldridge, played their home games at the Student Recreation Center Arena and were members of the Big West Conference. Due to low APR scores, the Highlanders were ineligible for post season play, including the Big West Tournament. They finished the season 6–25, 3–15 in Big West play to finish in last place.

On December 15, the Highlanders tied the Big West conference record for fewest points scored in a single game, in a 26–70 loss at USC. It was also a school record for the fewest points scored in a game, breaking the previous record of 30 points which they had set earlier in the season against Fresno State in November.

Roster

Schedule

|-
!colspan=9| Exhibition

|-
!colspan=9| Regular Season

References

UC Riverside Highlanders men's basketball seasons
UC Riverside